Brandy Melville is an Italian clothing and fashion accessories brand that markets their products to young women. Brandy Melville makes clothes of only one size in order to make the business more economically and environmentally efficient. The company was established in Italy by Silvio Marsan but gained most of its popularity in California. The brand name and logo was inspired by the fictional tale of two people – Brandy, an American girl, and Melville, an English man, who met in Rome and fell in love.

History 
Silvio Marsan and his son Stefan founded Brandy Melville in Italy in the early 80s, and opened their first US store in 2009, in the Westwood area of Los Angeles, which borders the UCLA campus. The business grew popular among young girls, in part due to their Malibu teen aesthetic. The Brandy Melville Instagram page has over 3.2 million followers as of October 2022. The store's aesthetics feature a bleached wood theme and muted color palette.

The company's products are sold in physical stores across the world, including Europe, the United States, Asia, Canada, and Australia, as well as on the Brandy Melville website.

Market and target demographic 
Brandy Melville has been described as trend-setting, relevant, cool and fast fashion, and their most prominent buyers are young teen girls looking for trendy fashion from popular name brands. In 2014, according to Piper Jaffray's semiannual report on teen spending, Brandy Melville took the number one spot for up trending brands that year. Brandy Melville's product research team consists of teenage employees, starting at age 14, who attempt to keep the company's styles contemporary and on trend. Kjerstin Skorge, a Brandy Melville employee at the company's Santa Monica location, discusses employee involvement regarding trending styles. Skorge goes on to say the following, “There are all kinds of things that we get asked, and we give our honest opinion." Brandy Melville relies on the opinions and advice of their employees as they are a part of their target audience. 

The company does not use traditional advertising techniques and instead depends heavily on social media marketing and partnerships. Ariana Grande, alongside other famous figures, wears Brandy Melville, aiding in the promotion of the brand. Well-known stores, such as PacSun and Nordstrom, sell Brandy Melville products, furthering the promotion of Brandy Melville. There is very little evidence of Brandy Melville representatives speaking on record, rarely any promotional press, and there has been rumor that the employees are not allowed to discuss the company history or the identity of the CEO with anyone.

Controversies 
During its rise in popularity, Brandy Melville has faced considerable controversy for its "one-size" policy and lack of size inclusivity. In 2015, Brandy Melville’s social media manager Aprille Balsom commented: “It’s actually not one size fits all it’s just one size, which is a big conception”. Each item is manufactured in one or two sizes, but these sizes are different depending on the item. Many consumers react poorly to this concept; however, the brand has found that it’s much more economically and environmentally efficient to produce one size of each item.

Current operations and franchises 
As of January 2021, Brandy Melville has 97 locations in various countries, with 36 locations in the US.

Locations Worldwide:

References

Fashion accessory brands
Clothing companies of Italy
Clothing companies established in 1970